Jeff Fisher is an American football player and coach.

Jeff(rey) or Geoff(rey) Fisher may also refer to:

Jeff Fisher (composer), Canadian composer and musician
Jeff W. Fisher, suffragan bishop of the Episcopal Diocese of Texas
Jeffrey L. Fisher (born 1970), American law professor
Geoffrey Fisher (1887–1972), archbishop
Jeff Fisher (rugby league) in 1981 Eastern Suburbs Roosters season
Jeff Fisher (author) (born 1960), American author

See also
Jeff Fischer (disambiguation)